The Family of Medium Tactical Vehicles (FMTV) is a series of military vehicles that are based on a common chassis and vary by payload and mission requirements. The FMTV is derived from the Austrian Steyr 12M18 truck, but substantially modified to meet United States Army requirements, these including a minimum 50 percent U.S. content.

There were originally 17 FMTV variants—four variants in the nominal 2.5 U.S. ton payload class, designated Light Medium Tactical Vehicle (LMTV), and 13 variants with a nominal 5 U.S. ton payload rating, called Medium Tactical Vehicle (MTV).

Since the first FMTVs were fielded in January 1996 the family has been expanded and the overall design enhanced considerably. The FMTV was originally manufactured by Stewart & Stevenson (1996–2006), then by Armor Holdings (2006–2007), then by what is now BAE Systems Platforms & Services until 2011. It is currently manufactured by Oshkosh Corporation.

Development and production history

FMTV's origins trace back to a U.S. Army Training and Doctrine Command (TRADOC) requirements document issued in 1983 for a Medium Tactical Truck (MTT), the intended replacement for the in-service 2.5-ton truck. In July 1984 a program to look at a future 5-ton truck procurement to replace in-service 2.5- and 5-ton trucks began. Cost analysis demonstrated that the procurement should be for both 2.5- and 5-ton trucks, and in October 1984 FMTV formally began as a program. The request for proposals (RFP) for FMTV was released in 1988. At this time it was expected that around 120,000 trucks would be ordered over three five-year contracts.

In October 1988, the United States Army awarded contracts to Stewart & Stevenson, the Tactical Truck Corporation (a 50/50 joint venture between General Motors Military Vehicles and the BMY Wheeled Vehicle Division of the Harsco Corporation), and Teledyne Continental Motors for 15 prototype vehicles each, these to be completed by January 1989. In October 1991 a five-year FMTV contract was awarded to Stewart & Stevenson. The initial contract order total was expected to be 20,000 vehicles, but this was reduced to 10,843 vehicles valued at US$1.2 billion. Some options were added and raised the total to 11,197 vehicles over what would be extended to seven contract years. The first FMTVs were fielded in January 1996.

In October 1998 Stewart & Stevenson was awarded the second FMTV contract, this for 8,000 trucks and 1,500 companion trailers and with a value of $1.4 billion. Total quantities including options were 11,491 trucks and 2,292 trailers, delivered between September 1999 and October 2004. Trucks were the improved A1 model, with improvements including an uprated engine (1998 EPA compliant) and transmission, and the introduction of ABS braking. The first A1 models were fielded in July 2000.

Stewart & Stevenson and Oshkosh Truck Corporation were awarded contracts in April 2001 for the Evaluation Phase (Phase 1) of the FMTV A1 Competitive Rebuy (FMTV A1 CR) program for the next FMTV production contract. Following trials and evaluation, in April 2003 the contract was awarded to Stewart & Stevenson. Production of the FMTV A1 CR (designated FMTV A1R) began in Q3 2004. Improvements to A1R models were numerous and included a new EPA 2004 compliant Caterpillar C7 engine. A total of 21,149 FMTVs and companion trailers were built under the FMTV A1R contract award.

In May 2006, Stewart & Stevenson was acquired by Armor Holdings Inc., and in August 2007, Armor Holdings was acquired by BAE Systems.

The United States Army had intended that the Future Tactical Truck System (FTTS) with just two variants would eventually replace virtually all of its tactical wheeled vehicle fleet including the FMTV. FTTS never materialized, however along with inputs from other efforts it continues to be used to define requirements for future United States Army trucks. With FTTS already faltering, BAE Systems was awarded a bridging contract in June 2008 for up to 10,000 FMTVs or trailers, the contract including an option (which was exercised) for 10,000 additional vehicles.

In May 2009 BAE Systems, Navistar Defense and Oshkosh Defense each announced they had submitted proposals for the FMTV A1P2 competitive rebuy program to the U.S. Army's Tank-Automotive and Armaments Command (TACOM) Life Cycle Management Command. In August 2009, the United States Army announced that Oshkosh Defense had been awarded the FMTV A1P2 rebuy production contract. The award was protested by both BAE Systems and Navistar.

The FMTV A1P2 rebuy was awarded as a five-year 'build-to-print' requirements-type award that at award allowed the U.S. government to order from 0 up to 12,415 trucks and 10,926 trailers through to calendar year 2014. Some FMTV variants are excluded from the rebuy competition, those excluded include specialist FMTV variants such as HIMARS, Patriot, MEADS and LVAD, plus all the armored cabs developed by BAE Systems.

According to the United States Army (in February 2012) all FMTV work with BAE Systems (minus a small number of armor B-kits) had concluded, BAE Systems and legacy companies having delivered around 74,000 FMTV trucks and trailers to the United States Army.

U.S. budgetary projections of March 2012 suggested that due to funding constraints the FMTV program would be terminated in FY14. Under the FMTV contract orders could be placed until December 2013, with first deliveries to commence within one year of that, with final deliveries one year later. Contract extensions have been made and the Justification and Approval (J&A) notice for the latest of these, which will extend the FMTV contract from 30 September 2016 to 25 August 2019 and will allow for the continued procurement of FMTV A1P2s, was released on 14 October 2016. One day earlier, on 13 October 2016 the U.S. Army solicited proposals for the FMTV A2 rebuy competition.

On 11 January 2017 Israel's Ministry of Defense announced it would be acquiring 200 FMTVs from Oshkosh in a contract valued at $200 million. Deliveries are expected to start this year and conclude mid-2018. The MoD noted that additional orders are likely. At this time Oshkosh confirmed that since deliveries started in 2010, the company had received orders for over 24,500 FMTV trucks and 11,400 FMTV trailers.

On 21 September 2017 Oshkosh announced that the U.S. Army had announced an administrative modification to the FMTV A1P2 requirements contract with the company, this to establish the eighth, ninth and tenth Order Years' pricing under the contract, at an estimated value of $466 million. This administrative modification authorizes future orders under the FMTV A1P2 contract through August 25, 2019. This contract extension will close out production of the FMTV A1P2.

On 21 September an order for 1,065 FMTVs at a value of $260.1 million under Order Year 8 of the latest contract extension was announced. On 27 September a further two Order Year 8 orders for a total of 148 FMTVs valued at more than $36 million was announced, with Oshkosh also confirming that the company had delivered more than 36,200 FMTV trucks and trailers. On 6 November Oshkosh announced the delivery of the 25,000th FMTV truck to the US Army. On 14 June 2018 Oshkosh announced that the U.S. Army Contracting Command had placed four additional orders for a total of 771 FMTV A1P2s, valued at $159.6 million.

Oshkosh Defense announced on 27 February 2019 that the U.S. Army Tank-automotive and Armaments Command (TACOM) Life Cycle Management Command (LCMC) had placed orders with the company for a further 354 FMTV A1P2 trucks and trailers at a value of $75 million. By February 2019, Oshkosh had delivered more than 38,100 FMTVs since the award of the FMTV A1P2 contract. On 28 June 2019 the US Department of Defence announced that Oshkosh had been awarded a $320,000,000 modification to domestic and Foreign Military Sales (Argentina, Djibouti, Iraq, Lebanon, Romania) contract W56HZV-09-D-0159 for procurement of Family of Medium Tactical Vehicle variants. Estimated completion date is 24 August 2021.

In August 2021 Oshkosh confirmed that the company had produced over 40,500 A1P2 trucks and trailers.

FMTVs are currently being reset at the Red River Army Depot on return from deployed operations, and current projections are for a Recap (Recapitalization) program to commence in 2020/2021.

Technical description and variants
The 2.5-ton (4×4) FMTV is designated as the Light Medium Tactical Vehicle (LMTV), while the 5-ton (6×6) is designated the Medium Tactical Vehicle (MTV).

The FMTV is based on the Austrian Steyr 12 M 18 (4×4) truck, but substantially modified to meet United States Army requirements that included a minimum 50% US content. The original 15 FMTV prototypes were assembled in Austria and while based on the 12 M 18 chassis-cab, were fitted with a number of US-supplied/specification components including a Caterpillar diesel engine, Allison automatic transmission and Meritor drive axles.

In a move away from previous United States Army designs, a cab over engine (COE) design was selected for the FMTV as while the US Army did not specify this configuration, given the Cold War situation prevailing at the time it had indicated that overall length for shipboard transport was a consideration.

On a model-for-model basis the FMTV is around 3 ft. shorter than its bonneted predecessors, while retaining a C-130 Hercules transport capability. Subject to load dimensions, all original FMTV variants are C-130 transportable at GVWR and all models capable of being transported underslung by helicopter are fitted with a sliding outrigger system. Low Altitude Parachute Extraction System (LAPES), later revised to Low Velocity Air Drop (LVAD) variants of A0 production LMTV (M1081 cargo) and MTV (M1093 cargo and M1094 dump) variants were produced.

The chassis and cab of the FMTV feature extensive corrosion protection.  It was the first truck to pass the United States Army's 22-year accelerated corrosion test.

The design of FMTV has never remained static and to further increase reliability, user friendliness and operational flexibility, detailed refinements/upgrades have continued throughout FMTVs production run.

FMTV is built around a conventional bolted / huck-bolted, cold-formed C-section chassis with bolted-in tubular cross-members. The high-grade 758 MPa steel used is sourced from Sweden. LMTV variants can be fitted with a DP-10J winch with an 11,000 lb. line pull. MTV variants use a DP-515 winch with a 15,500 lbs. line pull.

Current production FMTV A1P2s are powered by a 2007 Environmental Protection Agency (EPA) emissions compliant 7.2-liter six-cylinder Caterpillar C7 diesel engine developing 275 hp and 860 Lb.-Ft. torque in LMTV variants and 330 hp and 860 Lb-Ft.torque in MTV variants. FMTV A1Rs have a 2004 EPA emissions compliant version of the same engine with the same power output. FMTV A1 variants have an earlier 1998 EPA emissions compliant version of this engine, the 3126 ATAAC which developed 275 hp at 2400 rpm and 815 Lb.-Ft.torque at 1,600 rpm in LMTV variants and 330 hp and 850 Lb.-Ft.torque in MTV variants. A 6.6-liter derivative of this engine, the 3116 ATAAC, was fitted to FMTV A0 models where it developed 225 hp and 735 Lb.-Ft. torque in LMTV variants, and 290 hp at 2600 rpm and 860 Lb.-Ft. torque in MTV variants.

The Allison 3070 SP seven-speed transmission fitted to A1P2 and A1R FMTVs has also evolved with the FMTV, its A1 designation being MD 3070 PT, its A0 designation being MD-D7. This has an integral single-speed transfer case. All-wheel drive is full-time, with a 30/70 per cent front/rear torque split for on-road driving, and a 50/50 per cent split for off-road driving.

All FMTV models are fitted with Meritor beam axles, the ratings and specifications of which have also evolved as the FMTV has developed. Suspension is by a combination of parabolic tapered leaf springs (inverted on the MTV rear bogie), shock-absorbers, and an anti-roll bar for the rear axle/bogie;

Two cargo trailers are part of the Family of Medium Tactical Vehicles (FMTV). The M1082 single-axle trailer is used with the LMTV cargo truck and the M1095 twin-axle trailer is use with the MTV cargo truck. Both trailers have payloads that match that of the towing truck, and they share many components (including axles) with the towing truck.

Variants
(sequenced by U.S. Army M number)

M1078 A0/A1/A1R/A1P2 – LMTV Cargo NSN 2320-01-549-8577
M1078 A0/A1/A1R/A1P2 – LMTV Cargo with winch NSN 2320-01-549-8611
M1079 A0/A1/A1R/A1P2 – LMTV Van NSN 2320-01-552-7745
M1079 A0/A1/A1R/A1P2 – LMTV Van with winch NSN 2320-01-552-7749
M1080 A0/A1/A1R/A1P2 – LMTV Chassis 3.9 m NSN 2320-01-552-7791
M1081 A0 – LMTV Cargo-airdrop LVAD
M1082 A1/A1R/A1P2 – Trailer, LMTV cargo NSN 2320-01-449-1775
M1083 A0/A1/A1R/A1P2 – MTV Cargo NSN 2320-01-549-8610
M1083 A0/A1/A1R/A1P2 – MTV Cargo with winch NSN 2320-01-549-8565
M1084 A0/A1/A1R/A1P2 – MTV Cargo with material handling equipment (MHE) NSN 2320-01-552-7739
M1084 A0/A1/A1R/A1P2/RSV – MTV Cargo with MHE (HIMARS RSV) NSN 2320-01-552-7767
M1085 A0/A1/A1R/A1P2 – MTV Cargo, Long Wheelbase Cargo (LWB) NSN 2320-01-552-7773
M1085 A0/A1/A1R/A1P2 – MTV LWB Cargo with winch NSN 2320-01-552-7770
M1085 A0/A1/A1R/A1P2 – MTV LWB Cargo w/ Sideboard Delete NSN 2320-01-552-7770
M1086 A0/A1/A1R/A1P2 – MTV LWB Cargo with MHE NSN 2320-01-552-7780
M1086 A0/A1/A1R/A1P2 – MTV LWB Cargo with MHE & winch NSN 2320-01-552-7776
M1087 A1R/A1P2 – MTV Expansible Van NSN 2320-01-552-7781
M1088 A0/A1/A1R/A1P2 – MTV Tractor NSN 2320-01-552-7759
M1088 A0/A1/A1R/A1P2 – MTV Tractor with winch NSN 2320-01-552-7759
M1089 A0/A1/A1R/A1P2 – MTV Wrecker Oshkosh-produced M1089 have different recovery equipment NSN 2320-01-595-3994
M1090 A0/A1 – MTV Dump
M1091 – MTV 1,500 gallon Fuel Tanker Type Classified but did not enter production
M1092 A0/A1/A1R/A1P2 – MTV Chassis 4.1 m NSN 2320-01-552-7793
M1093 A0 – MTV Cargo-airdrop LVAD
M1094 A0 – MTV Dump-airdrop LVAD
M1095 A1/A1R/A1P2 – Trailer, MTV Cargo NSN 2320-01-449-1776
M1096 A0/A1/A1R/A1P2 – MTV LWB Chassis 4.5 m NSN 2320-01-552-7796
M1140 A1/A1R HIMARS High Mobility Artillery Rocket System, launcher chassis
M1147 LHS (palletized) Load Handling System Trailer NSN 2320-01-508-7887
M1148 A1R/A1P2 LHS (palletized) Load Handling System Truck, eight metric tonnes / 8.8-ton NSN 2320-01-557-4546
M1157 A1R/A1P2 10-ton Dump NSN 2320-01-552-7787
M1157 A1R/A1P2 10-ton Dump with winch NSN 2320-01-552-7782
XM1160 10-ton MEADS air defense chassis (5.5 m wheelbase )
Mongoose Mobile Launcher Chassis (MLC) (cancelled)
M1273 A1P2 MTV 10-ton chassis NSN 2320-01-621-6239

 MHE: material handling equipment
 RSV: re-supply vehicle
 LHS: load handling system
 LWB: long wheelbase

Armored cabs and fully armored derivatives
Current and recent operational scenarios call for logistic trucks of the FMTV type to have at least the option of cab armoring. When it entered production, armoring was not considered an option for the FMTV.
The first protection solution for the FMTV was not in answer to such scenarios, but was developed by Stewart & Stevenson and O'Gara-Hess & Eisenhardt Armoring Company (OHE). Called the Crew Protected Cab, it was specifically for the HIMARS variant and offered flash and Foreign Object Debris (FOD) protection during launch. Designs followed for an Enhanced Crew Protected Cab, and later an Armor Protected Cab, each adding more ballistic capability against direct fire, artillery burst and mines.

To meet emerging threats on deployed operations, in March 2004 DRS Technical Services was awarded a $16.3 million contract to provide 272 armor protection kits for the FMTV. A total of 1,862 kits are understood to have been produced in total. These kits were based around ballistic-protection panels installed on standard FMTV cabs.

In answer to demands for greater crew protection, BAE Systems developed the Low Signature Armored Cab (LSAC) for all variants of the FMTV. The LSAC replaced the standard FMTV cab (with which it shares internals) in a remove and replace operation.

To meet the US Army's current Long Term Armor Strategy (LTAS) for armored cabs, BAE Systems developed the LTAS cab for the FMTV. BAE Systems states that it produced over 9,000 LTAS cabs for the FMTV A1P2 variant. All Oshkosh FMTV vehicles include the company's own LTAS-compliant armor solution.

LTAS is based around the A and B kit principles, this allowing for vehicles to be armored as required, and with the add-on applique package adaptable to prevailing threats and upgradeable as new armoring technologies emerge. The A-Kit, which includes a new cab, modifies the FMTV to allow the addition of armour; the B-Kit being the bulk of the armor itself.

The Caiman Mine Resistant Ambush Protected (MRAP) vehicle is based on the MTV A1R platform. The United States Marines placed an initial order with the then Armor Holdings for 1,170 Caiman in July 2007. In total 2,868 Caiman were ordered, with deliveries completed during November 2008. BAE Systems unveiled the Caiman MultiTerrain Vehicle (MTV) at AUSA in Winter 2010. The Caiman MTV is a modified version of the base Caiman that features a revised driveline, new chassis and upgraded fully independent suspension. BAE Systems received contracts to upgrade 2,071 (1,700 + 371) Caiman to Caiman MTV standard, these upgrades completed Q1/Q2 2014. Post-Afghanistan no Caiman MRAPs have been retained by U.S. armed forces, although some have been transferred to U.S. law enforcement agencies. Others have been offered as Excess Defense Articles (EDA) to Iraq, Jordan, Nigeria and the United Arab Emirates (UAE).

BAE Systems unveiled the Caiman Light (CLT) in 2008, a five-man 4×4 version of the Caiman. To meet the Iraqi Light Armored Vehicle Requirement (ILAV) BAE Systems offered a fully armored LMTV on which the LSAC cab was extended rearwards into a troop carrying body. Neither of these proposals entered production.

Prototype and developmental FMTVs
Working with Multidrive an LMTV was integrated with a powered companion trailer to produce a C-130 Hercules transportable vehicle with a 15,000 kg payload.
The FMTV Hybrid Hydraulic Vehicle (HHV) was selected as the test platform for the development of a hybrid hydraulic propulsion system.
The FMTV was selected as the platform to demonstrate that a 155 mm M777 howitzer and prime mover could, for the first time, be deployed in the same C-130 aircraft.
Stewart & Stevenson produced five hybrid electric FMTVs, each tailored for a specific application.
Stewart & Stevenson developed an 11-ton FMTV A1 demonstrator to demonstrate the growth potential of the FMTV family and C4ISR integration potential, via technology insertions, while retaining maximum commonality with the current FMTV fleet. A second vehicle with a tilt-type loadbed was also developed as part of the aborted Future Tactical Truck System (FTTS) requirement. A 13-ton demonstrator then followed.
Stewart & Stevenson developed a 13-ton Medium Tactical Truck Demonstrator (MTTD) that incorporated many of the technologies and capabilities that the Army then envisioned for its future trucks.
A number of 8×8 FMTVs have also been developed, these including examples for Australia's Land 121 (awarded to Rheinmetall MAN Military Vehicles (RMMV)), a 13-ton demonstrator with a load handling system, and a pair of chassis as part of the Future Tactical Truck System (FTTS) undertaking.
Oshkosh Corporation unveiled the FMTV Enhanced Protection & Mobility Demonstrator (EPMD) during 2012. The FMTV EPMD is fitted with Oshkosh's TAK-4 independent suspension system and a custom-fitted Oshkosh Underbody Improvement Kit (UIK).
 To help inform the U.S. Army's FMTV A2 acquisition strategy and performance upgrade requirements Nevada Automotive Test Center was awarded a contract in 2014 to manufacture and test two FMTV Technology Demonstrators. These are based on government-supplied M1157 A1P2 10-ton Dump chassis produced by Oshkosh, but upgraded by NATC. Testing concluded in February 2016.

FMTV A2 requirement
Early in 2014 the U.S. Army's Program Executive Officer for Combat Support and Combat Service Support (CS CSS) had suggested that the Army would be seeking a new medium truck family in the mid-2020s. On 13 October 2016 the U.S. Army solicited proposals for the FMTV A2 rebuy competition.

The FMTV A2 request for proposals (RfP) stated the program would seek "to integrate higher capacity suspension, wheels, and tires; integrate underbody protection; increase engine power; integrate higher capacity alternator; integrate data bus upgrade; and integrate safety enhancements". The winner of the contract would be asked to integrate such upgrades; build the vehicles, trailers, and kits; and provide program, maintenance, and logistics support. According to the RfP, the FMTV A2 contract is expected to cover five ordering years with two additional one-year option periods for a potential total of 2,400 vehicles if all options are exercise. In a subsequent statement, an Army spokesman said the RfP "includes an estimated quantity of approximately 2,400 new production vehicles. However, the actual quantities in any future award are undetermined and will depend on proposed pricing for this quantity, army requirements, and available funding."

Oshkosh announced on 8 May 2017 that the company had submitted a proposal in response to the RfP for the Family of Medium Tactical Vehicles (FMTV) A2 production effort. At this point, the U.S. Army anticipated a contract award announcement in the second quarter of fiscal year 2018 and stated that the next generation FMTV A2 would comprise 16 models and three trailers.

The Army announced on 7 February 2018 that it had selected Oshkosh to build to FMTV A2. The initial estimated contract value is $476.2 million with no cap on the number of vehicles the Army may purchase. The firm fixed price contract covers a five-year ordering period plus two additional one-year options. The estimated date of completion has previously been quoted as February 2022. Both Oshkosh and AM General submitted bids for the requirement. Following the FMTV A2 award Oshkosh initially built and delivered vehicles in support of Production Verification Testing (PVT), Live Fire Testing (LFT) and logistics development. In August 2021, it was announced by Oshkosh that the Army's Tank-Automotive and Armaments Command (TACOM) Life Cycle Management Command (LCMC) had awarded the company a $152 million delivery order for 541 FMTV A2. The Army is expected to begin fielding the A2 FMTV variant in June 2023.

FMTV A2 variants are:
 M1078A2 LMTV cargo, CARGO
 M1079A2 LMTV Van TRUCK, VAN
 M1080A2 LMTV Chassis CHASSIS, TRUCK
 M1082 Trailer TRAILER, Cargo, LMTV
 M1083A2 MTV Cargo TRUCK, CARGO
 M1084A2 MTV Cargo with MHE TRUCK, CARGO
 M1085A2 MTV Cargo LWB TRUCK, CARGO
 M1086A2 MTV LWB Cargo with MHE TRUCK,
 M1087A2 MTV Expansible Van TRUCK, VAN
 M1088A2 MTV Tractor TRUCK TRACTOR
 M1089A2 MTV Wrecker TRUCK, WRECKER
 M1092A2 MTV Chassis CHASSIS, TRUCK
 M1095 Trailer TRAILER, Cargo, MTV XXXX-XX-
 M1096A2 MTV LWB Chassis CHASSIS, TRUCK
 M1147 Trailer, LHST TRAILER, FMTV Load Handling
 M1148A2 LHS Truck TRUCK, MATERIALS HANDLING CONTAINER HOISTING
 M1157A2 10 Ton Dump TRUCK, DUMP XXXX-
 M1157A2 10 Ton Dump with winch TRUCK, DUMP
 M1273A2 10 Ton Dump Chassis CHASSIS,

Gallery
(Production FMTVs are presented in U.S. Army M number sequence)

Operators

Specific details of FMTV export orders are seldom officially announced, with a large quantity of deliveries covered by assorted US Foreign Military Sales (FMS) awards.
Djibouti, Lebanon and Romania were three countries listed as possible future recipients of FMTVs in a June 2019 US DoD FMS delivery announcement, with Romania and Lebanon since confirmed.

Afghan National Army (no details available)

Argentine Army (est. 48 M1083 A1P2 + 7 M1148)

Canadian Army (M1148 + LSAC in 2006)

Cameroon Army (2 × FMTV A1P2 6×6 in 2018; These were delivered under a US$378 million contract awarded in 2016. The order covers 1,543 FMTVs for Cameroon, Iraq, and Somalia, but does not say how many each country will receive)

 Hellenic Army (300 est. Prior to 2003)

Djibouti Army (no details available)

 Iraqi Army (Deliveries will include trucks under a US$378 million contract awarded in 2016. The order covers 1,543 FMTVs for Cameroon, Iraq, and Somalia, but does not say how many each country will receive))

Israeli Army (Order for 200 announced January 2017)

Royal Jordanian Army (>100 since 2006 inc. HIMARS)

Lebanese Army (2021; 100 to be delivered – 2.5- and 5-ton) 

 New Zealand Army (prior to 2003; M1089 wrecker)

 Romanian Army (54 M1084A1P2 and 10 M1089A1P2 ordered besides HIMARS)

 Royal Saudi Air Defense (est. 100 Patriot support vehicles)

 Singapore Army (HIMARS)
 (A USD378 million contract was awarded to Oshkosh in 2016 that covers 1,543 FMTVs for Cameroon, Iraq, and Somalia. The award does not say how many each country will receive, and actual deliveries to Somalia are to be confirmed)

Republic of China Army (deliveries in 1996 and 2011)

Royal Thai Army (deliveries in 1996; cargo)

 United Arab Emirates (>20 HIMARS)

 United States Army (includes Army National Guard and United States Marine Corps; BAE Systems and legacy companies – 74,000 trucks and trailers; Oshkosh Corporation – 36,200 trucks and trailers)
  dozens of FMTV vehicles were transferred along with the M777 howitzers. Armed Forces of Ukraine also use HIMARS.
(users of the FMTV-based Caiman MRAP are not included)

See also
BAE Caiman MRAP – based on FMTV chassis and automotives
M939 series trucks – previous U.S. Army 5-ton truck
M809 series trucks - previous U.S. Army 5-ton truck (remained in use alongside successor M939 series)
M35 series trucks – previous U.S. Army 2.5-ton truck
Oshkosh MTVR
Heavy Expanded Mobility Tactical Truck
Palletized load system
Logistics Vehicle System (LVS)
Leyland 4-tonne truck
RMMV HX range of trucks
Navistar 7000 series—based on International Workstar chassis

References

Further reading
 2012 US Army Weapon System Handbook (B&W), 
 FMTV Trucks in Detail: M1078, M1083 and M1084 Variants & M198 Howitzer: Photo Manual for Modelers, 
 Jane's Land Warfare Platforms 2015–2016: Logistics, Support & Unmanned, 
 Jane's Land Warfare Platforms 2014–2015: Logistics, Support & Unmanned, 
 Jane's Land Warfare Platforms: Logistics, Support & Unmanned 2014–2015
 Jane's Military Vehicles & Logistics 1998–1999', 
 Modern U.S. Military Vehicles'' by Fred Crismon, 
 

External links

 Oshkosh Defense FMTV
 Fox 11 News; 10,000 Oshkosh FMTVs
 Stewart & Stevenson FMTV
 Global Security's description
 FMTV Technical Manuals FMTV Technical Library
 US Army Technical Manuals at Liberated Manuals.com

Military trucks of the United States
Oshkosh vehicles
Military vehicles introduced in the 1990s